John L. Utz was an American football, baseball, and basketball player and coach. He served as the head football coach (1934–1935), men's basketball coach (1933–1936), and baseball coach at Muhlenberg College in Allentown, Pennsylvania.

References

1866 births
Year of death missing
American football tackles
Penn Quakers football players
Muhlenberg Mules football coaches
Muhlenberg Mules men's basketball coaches
Muhlenberg Mules baseball coaches